Black Hours is the debut solo studio album by The Walkmen's singer Hamilton Leithauser. The album was released on June 3, 2014. It features collaborations with Rostam Batmanglij from Vampire Weekend, Amber Coffman from Dirty Projectors, Richard Swift from the Shins, Morgan Henderson from Fleet Foxes, and Paul Maroon from the Walkmen.

Track listing
"5 AM"
"The Silent Orchestra"
"Alexandra"
"11 O’Clock Friday Night"
"St Mary's County"
"Self Pity"
"I Retired"
"I Don’t Need Anyone"
"Bless Your Heart"
"The Smallest Splinter"
"Waltz" [Deluxe edition]
"In Our Time (I'll Always Love You)" [Deluxe edition]
"Utrecht" [Deluxe edition]
"I’ll Never Love Again" [Deluxe edition]

Personnel
Hamilton Leithauser – vocals, guitar, bass, arrangements
Michael Harris – bowed bass
Morgan Henderson – upright bass, clarinet, bass, percussions, marimba
Richard Swift – drums, background vocals
Hugh McIntosh – drums
Paul Maroon – piano, organ, guitar, arrangements, background vocals
Amber Coffman – vocals
Rostam Batmanglij – guitar, bass, harmonica, piano, harpsichord, tambourine, shaker, background vocals
Anna Stumpf – vocals

References

2014 debut albums
Hamilton Leithauser albums
Albums produced by Rostam Batmanglij
Albums recorded at Electro-Vox Recording Studios